Arvinger is a metal band from Telemark in Norway. Arvinger has worked with a number of session musicians since the band was founded in 2001. Initially the band released a home studio record consisting of six songs at MP3.com, and received significant positive feedback from fans. They recorded three additional songs and published their first album, Helgards Fall, in 2003.

The band released an EP in 2017 on Nordic Mission Productions.

Members
Current
 Hauk – guitar, bass guitar, drum and keyboards (2001-present)
 Djerv – vocals (2001-present)

Session members
 Ronny Tegner (Pagan's Mind) – keyboards (2003-2004)
 Stephen Bengtsland Hasleberg – keyboards
 Lillian Eilevtjønn – female vocals (2003-2004)
 Ellen Miles – female vocals
 Elsie Thommesen – female vocals (2003-2004)
 Hilda Kathrine Eriksen – female vocals
 Ingrid Askvik – Hardanger fiddle (2003-2004)
 Johanne Rosenvinge Berling – violin
 David Husvik (Extol) – drums

Live members
 Simen Daniel Børven (Leprous) - bass guitar (2009)
 Jo Henning Børven (Antestor) - drums (2009, 2012)

Discography
Studio album
 Helgards Fall (2003)

EP
 Rast (2017)

References

External links
 Arvinger MySpace site (unofficial)

Norwegian unblack metal musical groups
Norwegian viking metal musical groups
Musical groups established in 2001
2001 establishments in Norway
Musical groups from Telemark